Ladyland is a German television series. The premiere episode on March 20, 2006, saw 1.56 million viewers with a market share of 7.9 percent. In the group of 14 to 49-year-olds, 900,000 viewers watched the show (market share: 10.6%).

See also
List of German television series

German comedy television series
2005 German television series debuts
2007 German television series endings
German-language television shows
Sat.1 original programming

References

External links